The Clifden Limestone Cave System is in the Western Southland Region of New Zealand, on private land close to the hamlet of Clifden.

Geology

The cave is formed in Miocene limestone created from the accumulation of shell fragments, sand and pebbles in the Epeiric Zealandia sea. It is a solutional cave.

Ecology

Glow worms or titiwai (Arachnocampa luminosa) find a natural habitat in the Clifden Cave System because of its damp environment with little or no wind.

Recreation

A marked through route with fixed ladders is available for properly equipped people who wish to experience caving, and other passages are accessible for experienced cavers.

References

Caves of New Zealand
Landforms of Southland, New Zealand